The Hadim Ibrahim Pasha Mosque is a 16th-century Ottoman mosque located in the Silivrikapi neighborhood of Istanbul, Turkey.

History 
The Hadim Ibrahim Pasha Mosque was designed by Ottoman imperial architect Mimar Sinan for the vizier Hadim (Eunuch) Ibrahim Pasha. The building was completed in 1551.

Architecture 
The mosque is in the form of a domed cube with an attached portico. There are three tiers of windows. The five small domes of the portico are supported by arches with marble columns. The stone minaret, on the southwest end of the portico, was rebuilt in 1763-64. The mosque is similar in design to the earlier Bali Pasha Mosque in the Yenibahçe district of Istanbul which was completed in 1504-05.

The mosque is decorated with a number of panels in coloured Iznik tiles. Under the portico on the north façade are three lunette panels and two roundels. The underglaze painted tiled panels have white thuluth lettering reserved on a dark cobalt blue background. Between the letters are flowers in purple and turquoise. Above the mihrab is a larger lunette panel painted in cobalt blue, turquoise and dark olive green. The purple colouring is characteristic of the 'Damascus' style of Iznik pottery but is unusual on tiles. The panels help establish the chronology of the different styles adopted by the Iznik potters.

Gallery

See also
List of Friday mosques designed by Mimar Sinan

References

Sources

Further reading

External links 
 Hadım İbrahim Paşa Camii, ArchNet.
 Some 60 pictures of the mosque

Mimar Sinan buildings
Ottoman mosques in Istanbul
1551 establishments in the Ottoman Empire
Mosques completed in 1551